A kolač (also spelled kolach, kolace or kolacky , from the Czech and Slovak plural koláče, sg. koláč, diminutive koláčky, meaning "cake/pie") is a type of sweet pastry that holds a portion of fruit surrounded by puffy dough. It is made from yeast dough and common flavors include quark, a dairy product, tvaroh spread, fruit jam and poppy seeds mixed with powidl (povidla).

Originating as a semisweet pastry from Central Europe, they have also become popular in parts of the United States, particularly in the state of Texas. The name originates from the Czech (Bohemian), and originally Old Slavonic word  meaning "circle", "wheel".

In some parts of the US, klobásník, which contains sausage or other meat, is also called kolach because the same dough is used. Unlike kolache, which came to the United States with Czech immigrants, klobásníky were first made by Czechs who settled in Texas. In contrast, Czech koláč is always sweet.

Kolache are often associated with the towns of Cedar Rapids, Iowa and Pocahontas, Iowa, where they were introduced by Czech immigrants in the 1870s. They are served at church suppers and on holidays but also as an everyday comfort food. Recipes are usually passed down with some including spices like mace or nutmeg. They can be filled with a combination of prune, apricot, cream cheese, poppy seed or assorted other fillings.

Holidays and festivals

Bujanov (a municipality in the South Bohemian Region of the Czech Republic) holds annual kolač celebrations and kolač marathon.

Several US cities hold annual Kolač Festival celebrations:

Tabor, South Dakota
Verdigre, Nebraska
Wilber, Nebraska
Prague, Nebraska
Caldwell, Texas 
New Prague, Minnesota; 
East Bernard, Texas; Crosby, Texas
Hallettsville, Texas
Prague, Oklahoma
St. Ludmila's Catholic Church in Cedar Rapids, Iowa
Kewaunee, Wisconsin

Both Verdigre, Nebraska, and Montgomery, Minnesota, claim to be the "Kolacky capital of the world". Prague, Nebraska, claims to be known as the home of the world's largest kolač. Both Caldwell, Texas, and West, Texas, claim the title of "Kolache Capital" of the state and kolache are extremely popular in Central and Eastern Texas. There is even a Texas Czech Belt which grew in the 1880s and is full of kolač bakeries.

Haugen, Wisconsin, is the Kolache Capital of Wisconsin. The village is a Bohemian settlement that celebrates its Czech Heritage during an annual festival (Haugen Fun Days). Kolache are a staple of the village's festival with Kolač sales, bake-offs, and tastings. Kolache may be found at Czech-American festivals in other communities in the United States.

It was the sweet chosen to represent the Czech Republic in the Café Europe initiative of the Austrian presidency of the European Union, on Europe Day 2007.

Many people in the United States refer to the sausage-filled Czech pastries as kolache, but these are klobasniky which were invented by Czech immigrants in Texas.

Related dishes

A related dish is a klobasnek, which is popular in central and southeast Texas, specifically Houston. It often uses similar bread but is filled with a link of sausage or ground sausage. Some people also refer to these as kolache, but they are more closely related to a "pig in a blanket". They may also contain ham, cheese, jalapeño, eggs and bacon/sausage, potato, etc., and resemble a "pig in a blanket". Czech settlers created klobasniky after they immigrated to Texas.

See also

 Danish pastry: a laminated sweet pastry
 Kolach: Slavic, Hungarian, and Romanian bread of the same name
 Rugelach: Jewish pastry originating in Poland
 Koloocheh: Iranian pastry
 Vatrushka: East Slavic pastry
 Murabbalı mecidiye: Turkish pastry

References

External links 
 
 
 
 Kolach  Video produced by Wisconsin Public Television

Pastries with poppy seeds
Czech-American cuisine
Czech pastries
Cuisine of Minnesota
Texan cuisine
Sweet breads
Yeast breads
Foods with jam

mk:Колач